Mohammed Muzen El Hallani, widely known as Assi El Hallani; born November 28, 1970), is a Lebanese singer and actor. El Helani's musical career started after winning Studio Al Fan, a TV program for young artists, at the age of 17. He has released more than a dozen albums, and his top hits include "Wani Mareq Mareet", "Amshi Lihali", "Mali Saber", "Akerhak Gedan", "Ahla Al Oyoun", "Shoag El Sahara", "Azabounii" , "Bel Kurdi" , "Saalouni" , "Ya Memah"  and "Kayed Ozzalak".

Biography

Early life
El Hellani was born in Jdeide, but he was originally from Harbata (Baalbek District), and is the third-youngest among his 13 brothers and sisters. El Helani studied for approximately five years (1985–1990) at the Higher Institute of Music in Lebanon, concentrating on the Oud performance and Arab vocal techniques.

Present
El Hallani has participated in important musical events including the Baalbeck International Festival, the Jerash Festival, the Carthage Festival, and a number of concerts around Europe, the Arab world and America. He regularly performs at fund-raising concerts throughout the Middle East in support of a range of charities in the region, including the Women's Development Association Hayati.

In August 2005, Hallani added his voice to the growing roster of celebrities helping WFP raise awareness about global hunger and poverty, recording a public service announcement explaining that 25,000 people die of hunger every day, 18,000 of the children.

Assi is a Judge in the Middle Eastern version of The Voice.

Personal life
Assi has been married to his wife, Collette (née Boulos), since 1995. They have three children together, two daughters Maritta Hallani and Dana Hellani and one son al-Waleed Hellani. Both Maritta and Al-Waleed have singing careers.

Discography

Albums

1991 : Mahlana Sawa
1992 : Ya Hala
1993 : Mahr El Zina
1994 : Wani Mareg Mareit
1995 : Ahebek Jedan
1996 : Ya Maima
1998 : Ahla El Oyoun
1999 : Shog El Sahara
2000 : Kid Ozzalak
2001 : Ater El Mahabah
2002 : E Qarar
2003 : Forsat Omor
2004 : Zghiri El Dinney
2006 : Dagat Galbi
2007 : Ouwetna Bi Wehdetna
2008 : Yemkin
2010 : 010
2011 : Rouhak Ana
2013 : Assi 2013
2017 : Habib El Alb
2021 : Kel Al Fousoul

References

External links

1970 births
Living people
21st-century Lebanese male singers
Lebanese male actors
Lebanese male film actors
Lebanese male television actors
Singers who perform in Classical Arabic
Lebanese people of Iraqi descent
20th-century Lebanese male singers
Lebanese Shia Muslims